Jane Nshika Chalwe (born 4 April 1990) is a Zambian footballer who plays as a defender. She has been a member of the Zambia women's national team.

Club career
Chalwe has played for ZESCO United FC.

References

1990 births
Living people
Women's association football defenders
Zambian women's footballers
Zambia women's international footballers
ZESCO United F.C. players